Israel (vocalized  ʾIsrāʾēl or ይስራኤል Yisrāʾēl, c. 590) was a king of Axum. He is primarily known through the coins minted during his reign.

The Kebra Nagast and Ethiopian historical tradition states that Kaleb had two sons, Israel and Gabra Masqal. One tradition claims that Israel was governor of Adwa during his father's reign, but otherwise the Ethiopian chronicles tell little else about him. The official king list of the Ethiopian royal family, published in 1927, states that Israel ruled only for one month between Kaleb and Gabra Masqal.

Skeptical that this Israel was actually the son of King Kaleb, Munro-Hay suggests that Israel may have been better than the other kings between him and Kaleb (or Gabra Masqal), and tradition compressed the succession. Richard Pankhurst mentions the name of this king as an early example of Judaic influence in Ethiopian culture.

Notes 

Kings of Axum
6th-century monarchs in Africa